NADPH-dependent diflavin oxidoreductase 1 is an enzyme that in humans is encoded by the NDOR1 gene.

References

Further reading

Human proteins